Nea Sinasos (Greek: Νέα Σινασός) is a village in the northern part of the island of Euboea in Greece. It is situated northeast of Istiaia, on the road to Artemisio.  It was founded in the mid-1920s by refugees originating from Sinasos (present Mustafapaşa near Ürgüp) in Cappadocia.

Historical population

See also

List of settlements in the Euboea regional unit

References

Populated places in Euboea